Qadirpur (also Romanized as Qadīrpūr) is a village in Qaleh Rural District, in the Central District of Manujan County, Kerman Province, Iran. At the 2006 census, its population was 676, in 139 families.

References 

Populated places in Manujan County